Deborah D. Hudson, formerly Deborah Hudson Capano, (born August 16, 1952) is an American politician. She was a Republican member of the Delaware House of Representatives from 1995 to 2019 representing District 12. She earned her BS in human resources from the University of Delaware.

Electoral history
In 1994, Hudson won the general election with 4,623 votes (64%) against Democratic nominee Christine Whitehead.
In 1996, Hudson won the general election with 5,322 votes (58.9%) against Democratic nominee Brenda Smart.
In 1998, Hudson was unopposed for the general election, winning 4,772 votes.
In 2000, Hudson was unopposed for the general election, winning 7,301 votes.
In 2002, Hudson was unopposed for the general election, winning 5,939 votes.
In 2004, Hudson won the general election with 6,790 votes (65.2%) against Democratic nominee Harry Gravell.
In 2006, Hudson beat Gravell in a rematch, winning the general election with 5,133 votes (64.7%).
In 2008, Hudson was unopposed for the general election, winning 7,428 votes.
In 2010, Hudson won the general election with 6,067 votes (88.8%) against Libertarian candidate James Christina.
In 2012, Hudson was unopposed for the general election, winning 9,699 votes.
In 2014, Hudson won the general election with 5,726 votes (65.3%) against Democratic nominee Jeffry Porter.
In 2016, Hudson was unopposed for the general election, winning 9,866 votes.
In 2018, Hudson defeated her first primary challenger by winning the Republican primary. She subsequently lost the general election to Krista Griffith in a major upset.

References

External links
Official page at the Delaware General Assembly
Campaign site
 

1952 births
Living people
Republican Party members of the Delaware House of Representatives
People from Salisbury, Maryland
People from Wilmington, Delaware
University of Delaware alumni
Women state legislators in Delaware
21st-century American politicians
21st-century American women politicians